Bridge of Death may refer to:

Bridges
The Van Stadens Bridge in South Africa, known for its large number of suicide jumpers
A bridge in Nazi Germany-operated Lwów Ghetto (current  Ukraine) during World War II, under which thousands of Jews were killed
Bridge of Death (Pripyat) in Ukraine, a road bridge over a railway line, between the town of Prypiat and the Chernobyl Nuclear Power Plant, where there were unsubstantiated claims of deaths from radiation during the Chernobyl disaster

Other
Bridge of Death, a 1974 South Korean film directed by Lee Doo-yong
A bridge over the Gorge of Eternal Peril in the 1975 film Monty Python and the Holy Grail
"Bridge of Death", a song by the American band Manowar from their 1984 album Hail to England
"The Bridge of Death", a song by the Norwegian band Antestor from their 1998 album The Return of the Black Death

See also 
Chinvat Bridge, in Zoroastrianism, the bridge which separates the world of the living from the world of the dead